Maksim Andrianov (born 27 February 1988) is a Russian bobsledder. He competed in the two-man event at the 2018 Winter Olympics.

References

External links
 

1988 births
Living people
Russian male bobsledders
Olympic bobsledders of Russia
Bobsledders at the 2018 Winter Olympics
Bobsledders at the 2022 Winter Olympics